Brotzeit (lit. trans. "Bread time") is a traditional German savory snack native to Bavarian cuisine.

Typical items consumed as part of Brotzeit include  bread, butter, ham, sliced cheese, dried wurst, head cheese, hard-boiled egg, and popular condiments such as pickles, radishes, and onions.

Also commonly served as part of Brotzeit in Bavaria and Austria:

 Pretzels 
 Kartoffelkäse - a creamy potato-based spread
 Obatzda - a cheese spread seasoned with paprika

See also

References

Bavarian cuisine